Olga Oldřichová,  (born 1 June 1928) is a Czech former sprinter. She competed in the women's 100 metres at the 1948 Summer Olympics. Oldřichová also had five national titles and set national records in sprinting.

References

External links
 

1928 births
Living people
Athletes (track and field) at the 1948 Summer Olympics
Czech female sprinters
Olympic athletes of Czechoslovakia
Olympic female sprinters